Clifford Phelps Morehouse (April 18, 1904 – February 17, 1977) was a prominent lay Episcopalian journalist and publisher. 

In 1932, Morehouse succeeded his father, Frederic Cook Morehouse, as editor of The Living Church magazine. He was a member of the Executive Council of the Episcopal Church, and served as President of the House of Deputies of General Convention from 1961 to 1967.

See also 
Linden H. Morehouse

External links
 Biographical entry from The Episcopal Dictionary of the Church
 Bibliographic directory from Project Canterbury

1904 births
1977 deaths